The surname Mikos may refer to:

Mikos family, Hungarian noble family; see Mikosdpuszta
Gizella Mikos, wife of  [Salvador de Iturbide y Marzán]]
Michael J. Mikos, Polish American professor
Władysław Mikos (1885–1970), Polish painter
Bartosz Mikos (born 1980), Polish Olympic archer

See also
Miko (disambiguation)